Domiporta circula is a species of sea snail, a marine gastropod mollusk in the family Mitridae, the miters or miter snails. Their shell size ranges from 15 mm to 58 mm.

This species is distributed in the Red Sea and the Persian Gulf, the Indian Ocean along Madagascar, the Mascarene Basin and Mozambique; in the Pacific Ocean along Japan, Okinawa, the Philippines, Papua New Guinea, Tuamotus and Fiji

References

 Dautzenberg, Ph. (1929). Mollusques testacés marins de Madagascar. Faune des Colonies Francaises, Tome III
 MacNae, W. & M. Kalk (eds) (1958). A natural history of Inhaca Island, Mozambique. Witwatersrand Univ. Press, Johannesburg. I-iv, 163 pp
 Drivas, J. & M. Jay (1988). Coquillages de La Réunion et de l'île Maurice
 Cernohorsky W. O. (1991). The Mitridae of the world (Part 2). Monographs of Marine Mollusca 4. page(s): 112

External links
 Gastropods.com : Neocancilla circula; accessed : 11 December 2010

Mitridae
Gastropods described in 1838